Populus ciliata, the Himalayan poplar, is a large deciduous tree with tall clean straight trunk and wide rounded crown. The bark of the young trees is smooth greenish-grey and the bark of the old trees is dark brown with vertical cracks. Leaves are broadly ovate with serrulate-crenate and hairy margins. Flowers are drooping raceme catkins appear before or with leaves. Populus ciliata flowers are dioecious, individual flowers are either male or female. Perianth of male flowers is bell-shaped and female flowers are bluntly toothed. Their capsule encloses an average of 100–150 seeds, which are covered by long silky hair.

Ecology and distribution

Geographical distribution
Populus ciliata is natively distributed along the Himalayas through China, Pakistan, India (Jammu and Kashmir, Himachal Pradesh, Uttarakhand, Sikkim, Arunachal Pradesh), Nepal, Bhutan, and Myanmar.
Populus ciliata is exotic to Afghanistan, France, Iran, Italy, Japan, New Zealand, and the United States.

Natural habitat
Populus ciliata prefers moist cool places and grows in sandy, loamy, and clay soil. It grows well in acidic or neutral soil conditions. Shade inhibits the growth of P. ciliata.

Reproductive biology
Populus ciliata is a dioecious tree which is pollinated by the wind. The fruits grow in about 3 months after pollination. Seed dispersal takes place from about the middle of June to the middle of July depending upon the climate. It can reproduce through seed and vegetative means.

Propagation

The seeds weigh about 15 million/kg. In spring, seeds disperse as soon as they mature as they have an extremely short period of viability and needs to be spread within a few days of maturing. Fresh seeds exhibit high viability giving a germination rate of up to 75–90%.

Uses

Food
Populus ciliata is chopped for food and stored to be fed to livestock during the times of food shortage.

Fuel
Populus ciliata is used as fuel wood.

Timber
Populus ciliata wood is used for making boxes for packing purposes, also for poles, trucks and barrow-trays, coaches, furniture and cross-beams.

Medicine
Bark is used to make tonic, stimulants and blood purifier. The paste of the bark, when mixed with the ash of cow dung, can be used to treat muscular swellings.

Other

Populus ciliata provides paper for writing, wrapping and printing.

Erosion control

This tree can be used to control erosion as it easily establishes in shallow soils  and exhibits a fast growth rate and produces numerous strong lateral roots with little taper. Hence, extensive use of this tree is made in China, Japan, the USA and New Zealand to bind soil in erosion-prone areas.

Pests and diseases

During raining season, the leaves of the tree become extensively colonized by leaf defoliators such as Pyragea cupreata and P. fulgurita. In India record show that this tree has been a victim of the plant parasite known as Loranthus elatus. Other pathogens that cause premature defoliation in this species include Bipolaris mydis, Pseudocercospora salicia and Phorma macrostoma. Incidences of ganoderma root rot have also been reported in this species.

References

External links

ciliata
Trees of China
Trees of the Indian subcontinent
Trees of Myanmar